State Route 353 (SR 353) is a state highway in the northeastern portion of the U.S. state of Tennessee, in the area known as the Tri-Cities region. It connects the community of South Central with the town of Jonesborough.

Route description
SR 353 begins at an intersection with SR 107 in South Central as Bailey Bridge Road. Approximately  from SR 107, the route crosses the Nolichucky River. It continues to the community of Washington College, where Bailey Bridge Road ends and SR 353 becomes Old State Route 34. It continues northeast through rural areas to pass through Telford. It meets its northern terminus in Jonesborough, an intersection with SR 81 southwest of downtown.

Major intersections

History

The original designation for SR 353 was State Route 81A (SR 81A), an alternate route of SR 81. But as with most alternate routes that existed within the Tennessee, it was renumbered, which is when it gained its current designation.

See also
 
 
 List of state routes in Tennessee

References

353
Transportation in Washington County, Tennessee